Waukesha attack may refer to:

2014 Slender Man stabbing, in Waukesha, Wisconsin, on May 31, 2014, where middle school girls attacked and stabbed another middle school girl to appease the fictional character Slender Man.
2021 Waukesha Christmas parade attack on November 21, 2021, where a speeding SUV struck parade-goers.

See also
Waukesha (disambiguation)